Bletchley is a village in Shropshire, England, near Market Drayton.  It is situated close to the A41 Roman road.

See also
Listed buildings in Moreton Say

External links

Villages in Shropshire